Yours and Mine (Wo de shen jing bing) is a 1997 Taiwanese comedy film directed by Shaudi Wang. The film was selected as the Taiwanese entry for the Best Foreign Language Film at the 70th Academy Awards, but was not accepted as a nominee.

Cast
 Shiang-chyi Chen
 Bao-Ming Gu
 Cheng-sheng Lin
 Liang-Tso Liu
 Pai Bing-bing

See also
 List of submissions to the 70th Academy Awards for Best Foreign Language Film
 List of Taiwanese submissions for the Academy Award for Best Foreign Language Film

References

External links
 

1997 films
1997 comedy films
Taiwanese comedy films
1990s Mandarin-language films